The Amarapura Nikaya was a Sri Lankan monastic fraternity (gaṇa or nikāya) founded in 1800. It is named after the city of Amarapura, Burma, the capital of the Konbaung Dynasty of Burma at that time. Amarapura Nikaya monks are Theravada Buddhists. On 16th of August 2019, the Amarapura and Ramanna Nikaya were unified as the Amarapura–Rāmañña Nikāya, making it the largest Buddhist fraternity in Sri Lanka.

History
By the mid-18th century, upasampada - higher ordination as a bhikkhu (monk), as distinct from sāmaṇera or novitiate ordination - had become extinct in Sri Lanka. The Buddhist order had become extinct thrice during the preceding five hundred years and was reestablished during the reigns of Vimaladharmasuriya I of Kandy (1591-1604) and Vimaladharmasuriya II of Kandy (1687-1707).  These reestablishments were short lived. This was a period when the Vinaya had been virtually abandoned and some members of the Sangha in the Kingdom of Kandy privately held land, had wives and children, resided in the private homes and were called Ganinnanses. On the initiative of Weliwita Sri Saranankara Thero (1698-1778) the Thai monk Upali Thera visited Kandy during the reign of Kirti Sri Rajasinha of Kandy (1747-1782) and once again reestablished the Buddhist order in Sri Lanka in 1753. It was called the Siam Nikaya after a name for Thailand.

However, in 1764, merely a decade after the reestablishment of the Buddhist order in Sri Lanka by reverend Upali, a group within the newly created Siam Nikaya succeeded in restricting upasampada only to the Govigama caste. It was a period when the traditional nobility of the Kingdom of Kandy was decimated by continuous wars with the Dutch rulers of the Maritime Provinces.  In the maritime provinces too a new order was replacing the old.  Mandarampura Puvata, a text from the Kandyan period, narrates the above radical changes to the monastic order and shows that it was not a unanimous decision by the body of the sangha. It says that thirty two ‘senior’ members of the Sangha who opposed this change were banished to Jaffna by the leaders of the reform.

The Govigama exclusivity of the Sangha thus secured in 1764 was almost immediately challenged by other castes who without the patronage of the King of Kandy or of the British, held their own upasampada ceremony at Totagamuwa Vihara in 1772. Another was held at Tangalle in 1798.  Neither of these ceremonies were approved by the Siam Nikaya which claimed that these were not in accordance with the Vinaya rules. King Rajadhi Rajasinghe (1782–1798) had made an order restricting the right of obtaining higher ordination to the members of a particular caste.

As a consequence of this ‘exclusively Govigama’ policy adopted in 1764 by the Siyam Nikaya, the Buddhists in the Maritime provinces were denied access to a valid ordination lineage.  Hoping to rectify this situation, wealthy laymen from the maritime provinces financed an expedition to Siam to found a new monastic lineage.

In 1799, Walitota Sri Gnanawimalatisssa a monk from the Salagama caste, from Balapitiya on the south western coast of Sri Lanka, departed for Siam with a group of novices to seek a new succession of Higher ordination. Two Sahabandu Mudaliyars and the other prominent dayakayas undertook to bear the expenses of the mission and make the necessary arrangements for the journey. But during the trip, they had an incident where the ship suddenly stopped moving. Once it was able to move again, the Dutch national Captain of the ship suggested that Buddhism was in a more flourishing condition in Amarapura, Burma than Siam. The monk agreed to the suggestion of the Captain and the latter, through the Dutch Consul at Hanthawaddy (now Bago, Burma), obtained the necessary introductions to the religious and administrative authorities in Amarapura. The first bhikkhu was ordained in Burma in 1800 by the Sangharaja of Burma, his party having been welcomed to Burma by King Bodawpaya. The members of the mission studied under the Sangharaja for two years.

The initial mission returned to Sri Lanka in 1803. Soon after their return to the island they established a udakhupkhepa sima (a flotilla of boats moved together to form a platform on the water) at the Maduganga River, Balapitiya and, under the most senior Burmese bhikkhus who accompanied them, held an upasampada ceremony on the Uposatha of Vesak.  The new fraternity came to be known as the Amarapura Nikaya after the capital city of King Bodawpaya.

Several subsequent trips to Burma by Karava and Durava monks as well, created by 1810 a core group of ordained monks and provided the required quorum for Higher Ordination of Amarapura Nikaya monks in Sri Lanka.  The higher ordination denied to them in 1764 by the Govigama conspirators had been regained and they were soon granted recognition by the colonial British government.  However, the radical change of ordination rules by the Siam Nikaya in 1764 and its continuance despite it being contrary to the teachings of the Gautama Buddha, plagues the Sri Lankan Buddhist Sangha, which remains divided on caste lines.

Significance 
The establishment of the Amarapura Nikaya was significant because it signaled a change in the social dynamic of Buddhism in Sri Lanka.  For the first time, a monastic lineage had been created not through royal patronage of a Buddhist king, but through the collective action of a dedicated group of Buddhist laymen.  The Amarapura Nikaya was thus both independent of government and royal power, and more closely tied to its patrons in the growing middle class.  This presaged both the growing power of the middle class in Sri Lanka during the 19th and 18th Centuries, and the rise of so-called Protestant Buddhism among the Sinhalese middle class- a modernized form of Buddhism in which increasing power and authority were vested in the laity, rather than monastic authorities.

Amarapura Mahasangha Sabha

The Amaprapura nikaya which was divided in to several sub nikayas (sub-orders) in the past was united on the initiatives taken by Balangoda Ananda Maitreya Thero and Madihe Pannaseeha Thero in the late 1960s. 'Sri Lanka Amarapura Mahasangha Sabha' was formed and a common higher ordination ceremony for all Amarapura nikaya was performed at the Uposathagharaya situated at Siri Vajiranana Dharmayatanaya, Maharagama on July 13, 1969. The event was graced by the then head of State, Governor-General of Ceylon William Gopallawa. A supreme Mahanayaka position for the Sri Lanka Amarapura Mahasangha Sabha was created with this initiative and Madihe Pannaseeha thero was appointed as the first monk to hold the prestigious title. In addition to the supreme Mahanayaka position a post for the president of the Amarapura Nikaya was created and Balangoda Ananda Maitreya thero was appointed as the first president of Amarapura Mahasangha Sabha. On 16th of August 2019, the Amarapura and Ramanna Nikaya were unified as the Amarapaura-Ramanna Samagri Maha Sangha Sabha, making it the largest Buddhist fraternity in Sri Lanka.

The following is a list of Supreme mahanayaka theros of the Amarapura Nikaya.

Sub-orders 

Right before its unification into the Amarapura–Rāmañña Nikāya, the Amarapura Nikāya was divided into no less than 21 sub-orders. These sub orders are believed to have been formed along caste divisions and regional differences.

 Amarapura Sirisaddhammawansa Maha Nikaya
 Amarapura Mulawamsika Nikaya
 Udarata Amarapura Nikaya
 Amarapura Sabaragamu Saddhamma Nikaya
 Saddhamma Yutthika (Matara) Nikaya
 Dadalu Paramparayatta Amarapura Nikaya
 Amarapura Mrammawansabhidhaja
 Amarapura Vajirawansa Nikaya
 Kalyanavansika Sri Dharmarama Saddhamma Yuttika Nikaya
 Sri Lanka Svejin Maha Nikaya
 Sabaragamu Saddhammawansa Nikaya
 Amarapura Ariyavansa Saddhamma Yuttika Nikaya
 Culagandhi Nikaya
 Udarata Amarapura Samagri Sangha Sabhawa
 Uva Amarapura Nikaya
 Amarapura Sri Dhammarakshita Nikaya
 Udukinda Amarapura Nikaya
 Sambuddha Sasanodaya Sangha Sabhawa
 Amarapura Maha Nikaya
 Amarapura Nikaya
 Sri Kalyaniwansa Nikaya

See also 
 Amarapura–Rāmañña Nikāya
 Sri Lankan Buddhism
 Weligama Sri Sumangala Mahanayake Thera
 Gangodawila Soma Thero

References 

 Gombrich, Richard.  Theravada Buddhism: A Social History from Ancient Benares to Modern Colombo.  Oxon, England: Routledge and Kegan Paul, Ltd., 2004.
 Rohan L. Jayetilleke, 'The bi-centennial of the Amarapura Maha Nikaya of Sri Lanka', Daily News, 17 September 2003 accessed 16 December 2005.
 Main Orders of the Sangha (metta.lk)

Religious organizations established in 1800
Theravada Buddhist orders
Schools of Buddhism founded in Sri Lanka
1800s establishments in Sri Lanka
2019 disestablishments in Sri Lanka